The sport of football in the country of Togo is run by the Togolese Football Federation. The association administers the national football team, as well as the Premier League. Football is the most popular sport in Togo.

Recent history
Togo qualified for the first time to a FIFA World Cup in 2006, for the edition to be held  in Germany; however, its participation was marred by incidents and headlines. There were problems within the Togolese Football Federation as well as between players and the Football Association, linked to were financial bonuses. The culmination of that conflict led to the resignation of the national team coach, Otto Pfister, and the threat made by the players not to play their game against Switzerland on 16 June 2006. Ultimately, the FIFA stepped in to satisfy the players' requirements and the first boycott of a FIFA World Cup game never happened. Togo was knocked out of the tournament in the group stage after losing to South Korea, Switzerland and France.
	 
Over the following months, the stalemate continued to mar Togolese football, and eventually resulted in the dismissal of strike pair and Kader Coubadja-Touré, and defender Daré Nibombé in March 2007, ostensibly for "indecent remarks concerning the FTF management."
	 
On 8 January 2010, The Togo National Football team's bus was fired upon in Angola whilst attending the African Nations Cup being held there. The bus driver, assistant coach and team spokesman died, and two players were also injured. This led to Togo withdrawing from the tournament at the behest of the Togolese government.
	 
On 12 April 2010, Emmanuel Adebayor, the most famous Togolese player, retired from duty with the Togo National team. He currently plays for Turkish Süper Lig side Kayserispor.
	 
On 26 November 2011, former Togo goalkeeper Charles Balogou was among six people killed when a bus, carrying players and officials from the Etoile Filante delegation, plunged into a ravine 130 kilometers north of Lomé and caught fire. Togo football federation spokesman Aime Ekpe said another 25 people from the delegation — 19 of them players — in addition to the driver were injured in the crash.

Togolese football venues

References

External links
Togo at FIFA.com